Kuja is a genus of African moths of the family Thyrididae.

Species
Some species of this genus are:

Kuja carcassoni Whalley, 1971
Kuja catenula (Pagenstecher, 1892)
Kuja effrenata Whalley, 1971
Kuja fractifascia (Warren, 1908)
Kuja gemmata (Hampson, 1906)
Kuja hamatipex (Hampson, 1916)
Kuja kibala Whalley, 1971
Kuja majuscula (Gaede, 1917)
Kuja obliquifascia (Warren, 1908)
Kuja squamigera (Pagenstecher, 1892)

References
 Whalley, 1971 . Bulletin of the British Museum (Natural History). Entomology.) Suppl. 17 : 117

Thyrididae
Moth genera